This is a list of international football matches of the Germany national football team between 1990 and 1999.

Following the reunification of Germany, the best players from the former East were added to a squad which were already reigning World champions of 1990. The unified German team reached the final of UEFA Euro 1992 only to surprisingly lose to Denmark, but then won the 1996 tournament in England. At the World Cup, Germany failed to maintain their own high standards (having been involved in the previous three finals), being eliminated in the quarter-final stage at both the 1994 and 1998 editions.

List of matches

Notes

Cancelled matches 
Below is a list of all matches in the period that were cancelled. Matches that were rescheduled to another date are not included.

See also 
 East Germany national football team results (1952–74)
 Germany national football team all-time record
 Germany national football team results (1908–42)
 Germany national football team results (2000–19)
 Germany national football team results (2020–present)
 West Germany national football team results (1950–90)

References

External links
Results archive at German Football Association (DFB)
Germany - International Results - Details 1990-1999 at RSSSF 
Results archive at National Football Teams
Results archive at World Football

Germany national football team results